In infrared optical communications, C-band (C for "conventional") refers to the wavelength range 1530–1565 nm, which corresponds to the amplification range of erbium doped fiber amplifiers (EDFAs). The C-band is located around the absorption minimum in optical fiber, where the loss reaches values as good as 0.2 dB/km, as well as an atmospheric transmission window (see figures). The C-band is located between the short wavelengths (S) band (1460–1530 nm) and the long wavelengths (L) band (1565–1625 nm). It includes the 50 GHz-spaced DWDM ITU channels 16 (1564.68 nm, 191.6 THz) to 59 (1530.33 nm, 195.9 THz).

References 

Infrared
Optical communications